Cory Gerald Joseph Marquardt (born October 11, 1989) is a Canadian country rock singer-songwriter, drummer, actor and former ice hockey player better known by his stage name Cory Marks. He is signed to Better Noise Music. He has released two albums, This Man in 2015 under Big Star Recordings and most recently Who I Am in 2020 under Better Noise. Since the release the album has accumulated over 150 million streams globally with his debut single "Outlaws & Outsiders" being certified gold in Canada and reaching top 10 at US rock radio, making Marks the first to ever do so as a Canadian country act.

Early life
Marks was raised in North Bay, Ontario, the younger brother of professional hockey player Matt Marquardt, and learned how to skate at three years old. He cites Merle Haggard, Waylon Jennings, Ozzy Osbourne, and Rush as early musical influences. Marks played university hockey at the Royal Military College of Canada where he also pursued dreams of becoming a fighter pilot. He had never performed music publicly until his friends encouraged him to do so while at a bar in college. He has performed using the name "Cory Marks" since the release of his debut album. Marks achieved his private pilot license in 2021.

Career

2014-2015: This Man
In July 2014, he released his first single to Canadian country radio, "Smartphone". His second single, "21", was released in April 2015. His first album, This Man was released on May 26, 2015 through Big Star Recordings. The album included his first two singles, as well as two further singles, "This Man", and "Nowhere With You".

2016-present: Who I Am and extended plays
In 2016, Marks signed a deal to work with award-winning producer Kevin Churko, known for work with Ozzy Osbourne, Shania Twain, and Five Finger Death Punch. In 2018, he signed a record deal with Eleven Seven Music (later rebranded as Better Noise Music) as their flagship country artist.

In November 2019, Marks released his first single on Better Noise, "Outlaws & Outsiders", featuring Ivan Moody, Travis Tritt, and Mick Mars, which debuted at #1 on iTunes in Canada as well as #1 on the Billboard Rock Digital Songs and Hard Rock Digital Songs charts and #7 on the Country Digital Songs charts. The song would later peak inside the top 10 on US Mainstream Rock radio, top 5 on German rock radio, and peaked at #12 on Canada Rock radio. It was also certified Gold by Music Canada.

In June 2020, Marks released "Drive", and announced it as the second single to country radio off his second album, Who I Am, which was released on August 7, 2020 through Better Noise. In October 2020, "Blame It on the Double" was released as the second single to rock radio in Germany and the United Kingdom. Marks also released his first Christmas single "Jingle My Bells", a cover of a song by The Tractors, that month. In April 2021, Marks released a new version of "Blame It on the Double" featuring Tyler Connolly of Theory of a Deadman and Jason Hook.

On June 18, 2021, Marks released the extended play Nashville Mornings. It included a cover of Merle Haggard's "If I Could Only Fly", as well as a "Country Mix" of "Blame It on the Double" featuring Tyler Connolly, which was sent to Canadian country radio. He followed that up with the extended play Nashville Nights on August 20, 2021, which included a new track "In Me I Trust", the solo version of "Outlaws & Outsiders", and live versions of "Drive" and "Blame It on the Double".

In November 2022, Marks released the extended play I Rise, which included the singles "Burn It Up" and "Flying". He supported Five Finger Death Punch on their headlining tour in the United States in the fall and winter of 2022 alongside Brantley Gilbert.

Discography

Albums

Extended plays

Singles

2010s

2020s

Christmas singles

Music videos

Awards and nominations

References

External links

 

1989 births
Living people
Canadian country singer-songwriters
Canadian ice hockey left wingers
Canadian male singer-songwriters
21st-century Canadian male actors
Canadian rock singers
Country rock singers
Musicians from Ontario
People from North Bay, Ontario
21st-century Canadian male singers